Daničić is a Croatian and Serbian surname. The surname may refer to:

Daničić (Uskok family), well-known Uskok family from Senj that was prominent in the 15th-18th century
Adolf Daničić (1861–1929), Croatian industrialist
Damjan Daničić (born 2000), Serbian footballer
Đuro Daničić (1825–1882), Croatian and Serbian philologist
Goran Daničić (1962-2021), Serbian actor
Patricia Daničić (born 1978), Croatian volleyball player

Croatian surnames
Serbian surnames